Adolphe Groscol (12 May 1904 – 24 August 1985) was a Belgian sprinter. He competed in the men's 100 metres at the 1928 Summer Olympics.

References

1904 births
1985 deaths
Athletes (track and field) at the 1928 Summer Olympics
Belgian male sprinters
Olympic athletes of Belgium
Place of birth missing